The N&D Group is a mutual insurance carrier based in Dedham, Massachusetts, comprising three regional property and casualty insurance companies which market personal and commercial insurance product lines through independent insurance agents. The group conducts business in Massachusetts, New Hampshire, and New Jersey, and wrote about $267 million in annual insurance premium in 2021. Founded as The Norfolk Mutual Fire Insurance Company in 1825, The N&D Group is one of the oldest mutual insurance companies in the United States.

History 
As early Dedham, Massachusetts residents were establishing new farms and businesses, it became apparent that the community needed financial protection against various risks such as fire. As a result, The Norfolk Mutual Fire Insurance Company was established by a group of prominent citizens, electing John Endicott as the company's first president. In 1847, Norfolk built an office building at 4 Pearl Street in Dedham Square. For the next 40 years, the building also housed the Dedham Institution for Savings, the Dedham Bank, and served as a home for the Norfolk County grand jury.

Throughout the early to mid 1900s, the company quickly grew and expanded to various states in the Northeast. In the 1950s, doing business in 26 states, the group constructed its headquarters building at their current address along the Charles River. After catastrophic events such as Hurricane Andrew, N&D eventually retrenched on its core business and now focuses on general P&C insurance in Massachusetts, New Hampshire, and New Jersey. About 400 independent agencies sell Norfolk & Dedham insurance products. The company employs about 150 people and manages roughly $800 million in assets.

In 2020, the company announced it would be reconstructing its corporate headquarters in Dedham, with demolition of their building in the summer of 2020. The project, which is being constructed on top of the footprint of the old building, is expected to be complete in the summer of 2022. In June of 2022, the construction project was completed.

The companies that make up The Norfolk & Dedham Insurance Group are:

 Norfolk & Dedham Mutual Fire Insurance Company – Established 1825
 Fitchburg Mutual Insurance Company – Established 1847
 Dorchester Mutual Insurance Company – Established 1855

Charity and local service 
Through The Norfolk & Dedham Foundation (established in 2017), The N&D Group has supported over 50 local organizations, including the Dedham Community House, Boston Food Bank, Pine Street Inn and the Cristo Rey Network.

Throughout each year, the company conducts volunteer days in support of charitable organizations working locally to the areas the company services.

References

Works cited

Financial services companies established in 1825
Mutual insurance companies of the United States
Companies based in Dedham, Massachusetts